Texas Dow Employees Credit Union (TDECU) is a credit union based in Lake Jackson, Texas, with 38 service locations, including 34 member centers. TDECU is the largest Houston-area credit union, and fourth largest in the state of Texas, with over 372,000 members and assets of $4.7 billion as of April 2022. In 2014, they purchased the naming rights to the University of Houston Cougars football stadium, TDECU Stadium.

History
The Texas Dow Employees Credit Union was founded by employees of Dow Chemical Company in December 1954, receiving its charter from the State Attorney General that month. Its first organizational meeting was held in the Freeport Junior High auditorium in Freeport, Texas, on January 3, 1955, with memberships available for deposits of up to five dollars. Membership was initially limited to Dow and Ethyl-Dow employees. In 1958, the credit union had 780 members and assets totaling $210,000; by 1971, it had a reported 8,500 members, with assets over $7.5 million. As of April 2022, it has over 366,000 members, with assets of $4.5 billion.

In December 2011, the company created TDECU Holdings to manage its subsidiaries: TDECU Insurance, TDECU Wealth Advisors, TDECU Real Estate and Century Oaks Title. 

Timothy D. Belton was named president and CEO of TDECU Holdings. In October 2012, Stephanie Sherrodd was appointed as TDECU's new president and CEO, replacing Edward Speed, who had served as CEO since 2003. In June 2021, Isaac Johnson was named President & CEO.

TDECU Stadium

In July 2014, the University of Houston and TDECU announced a naming rights partnership to rebrand the Houston Cougars' new 40,000-seat football stadium as TDECU Stadium, with TDECU paying $15 million over 10 years for the rights. The deal runs through June 16, 2024 and at the time was the third-most lucrative naming rights deal among NCAA facilities. There is also a mutual option to extend the deal for another five years at an additional $7.5 million after the original 10-year deal expires. It was the first major corporate sports venue sponsorship for TDECU, which previously had deals with the Texas Bowl game, Sugar Land Skeeters of the independent Atlantic League of Professional Baseball, and the Houston Livestock Show and Rodeo.

Locations
TDECU is based in Lake Jackson, Texas, and has 40 additional locations within Texas in Angleton, Bay City, Baytown, Brazoria, Cuero, Dallas, Edna, Fort Worth, Freeport, Hallettsville, Houston, Katy, Missouri City, Pasadena, Pearland, Port Lavaca, Rosenberg, Shenandoah, Sugar Land, Texas City, Victoria and Yoakum.

Services
TDECU provides the following services:

 Checking and savings accounts 
 Credit cards
 IRAs
 Money management
 Mortgage loans and related services
 Auto, home equity and personal loans 
 Life, health, auto and homeowners insurance 
 Liability insurance and workers compensation
 Investments and Financial Planning

Mergers and acquisitions
Some of TDECU's mergers and acquisitions include: a 2011 merger with Bluebonnet Credit Union of Houston; the 2012 acquisitions of Associated Insurance Agency in Houston, Assurance Insurance Agency of Bellville, Texas, and Burridge Insurance Agency of Angleton, Texas; the July 2013 acquisition of 7 branches from Hancock Bank; the 2014 acquisition of 1,200-member employee credit union of FMC Technologies; and a 2014 partnership with James E. Bashaw & Co. to help build TDECU's wealth management business.

References

External links
 Official website

1954 establishments in Texas
Credit unions based in Texas
Banks established in 1954
Banks based in Texas
Dow Chemical Company
Brazoria County, Texas